Edward Lewis Tullis (March 9, 1917 – October 6, 2005) was an American bishop of the United Methodist Church, and an advocate for women clergy.

Elected as a bishop in 1972, he presided over the Columbia, South Carolina episcopal area and then the Nashville, Tennessee episcopal area until his retirement in 1984.  He also served on the Board of Managers, the General Board of Missions, the Board of Managers of the Board of Discipleship, and the General Council on Finance and Administration.

Born in Cincinnati, Ohio, Tullis was a 1939 graduate of Kentucky Wesleyan College and was ordained in the Methodist Episcopal Church, South in 1939.  Before his election to the episcopacy in 1972, Tullis served 35 years as a pastor in Methodist churches in Kentucky, during which time he was also a Chaplain in the General Assembly of the Commonwealth of Kentucky.

Tullis served as a trustee of twelve colleges and seminaries. He remained active in retirement and authored several books – First Sermons, Shaping The Church from the Mind of Christ and The Heart of Evangelism – and his penultimate book, The Birth of The Book, which evolved from his experience teaching adult Sunday School for the preceding twenty years at Long's Chapel United Methodist Church in Lake Junaluska, North Carolina. His last book was a history of the Magee Christian Education Foundation, of which he had been a director for 40 years.

In 2004 Bishop Tullis was inducted into the Alumni Hall of Fame of Kentucky Wesleyan.  He died aged 88 on October 6, 2005 at his home in Lake Junaluska, North Carolina.

References

External links
Photo of Bishop Tullis
Kentucky Wesleyan College Alumni Hall of Fame: Reverend Edward Lewis Tullis
Obituary notice for Bishop Edward Lewis Tullis
Bishop Edward Tullis, church visionary, dead at 88 (UMC News service)

1917 births
2005 deaths
Kentucky Wesleyan College alumni
United Methodist bishops of the Southeastern Jurisdiction
20th-century American clergy